"Hold Up My Heart" is the first single from American Idol season 7 contestant Brooke White's post-Idol album, High Hopes & Heartbreak. It was released on iTunes on February 25, 2009. White performed the song on the second results show of the 8th season of American Idol. It debuted at number 47 on the U.S. Billboard Hot 100.

Charts

References

2009 singles
Brooke White songs
Pop ballads
2009 songs